Mick Dorney (1884 - 17 March 1952) was an Irish hurler who played as a forward for the Cork senior team. 

Dorney joined the team during the 1905 championship and became a regular player over the next decade. During that time he failed to secure an All-Ireland winner's medal, however, he did win a Munster winner's medal.

At club level, Dorney enjoyed a successful career with Blackrock, winning six county club championship winners' medals.

References

1884 births
1952 deaths
Blackrock National Hurling Club hurlers
Cork inter-county hurlers